= Gungbugh =

- Mixed Rural-Urban
- Location of Gungbugh within Jammu & Kashmir state
- Coordinates: 34°05′N 74°50′E
- Country: India
- State: Jammu and Kashmir
- City: Srinagar

Population (2025)
  - Total: 1,700

Languages
  - Official: Kashmiri, Urdu, Hindi, English
- Time zone: UTC+05:30 (IST)
- PIN: 190009
- Telephone code: 0194
- Vehicle registration: JK 01
- Police station: shergarhi
- Post Office: karan nagar
- constituency: Amira Kadal
- Famous areas: General chek, Karnal chek, Play ground

Gungbugh, is a small region of Srinagar city in Kashmir, situated on its outskirts. This place has been named Gungbugh due to a canal "Doodh Ganga" which passes nearby.

As of April 2025, the population is approximately 1700. Availability of fertile land and the presence of canal in its vicinity provides an opportunity to use the land for farming.most of the youth is employed in government & private sectors

== Farming ==
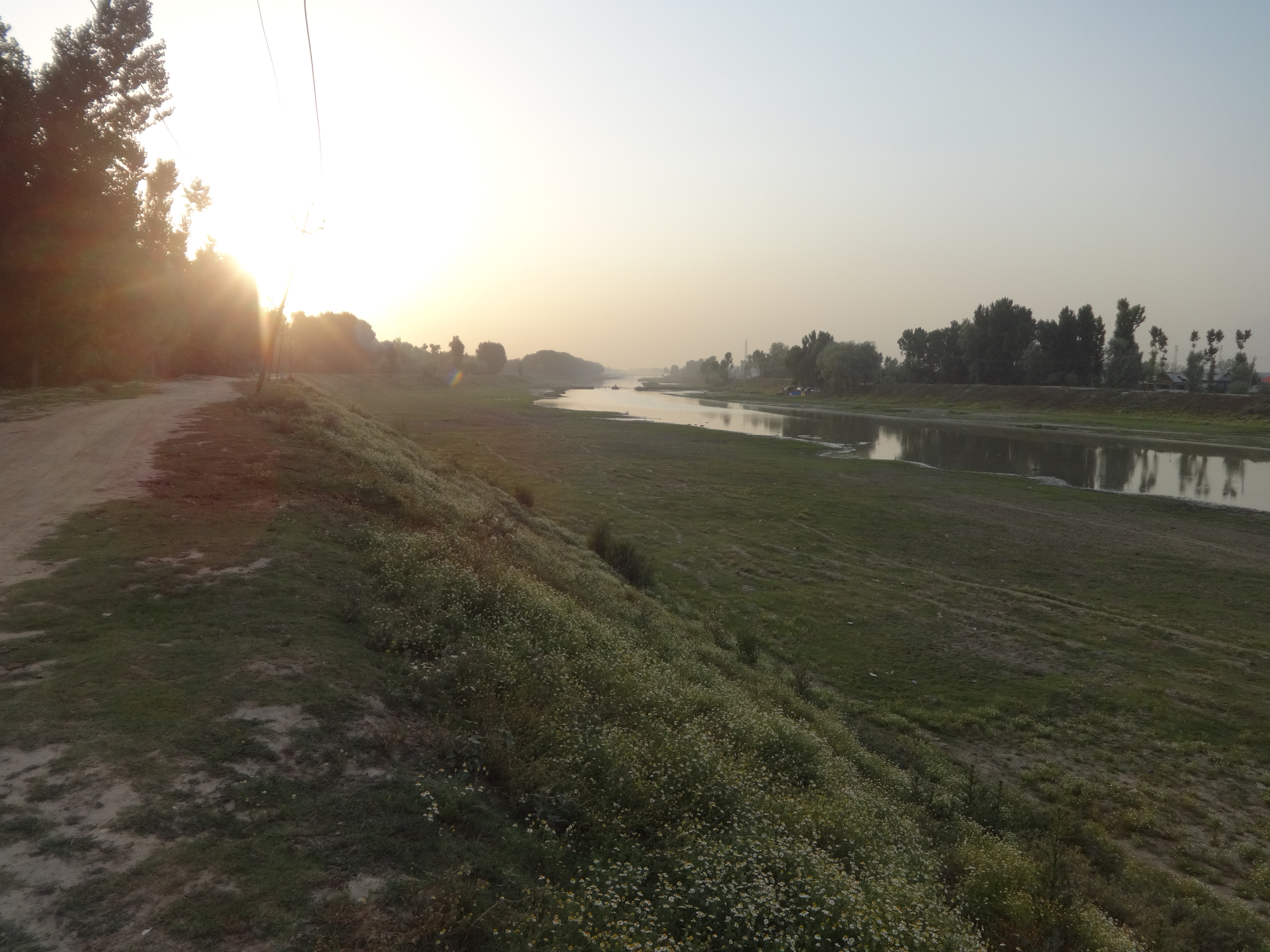
Gungbugh, bank of flood channel going towards bemina.

Gungbugh is known for spinach farming.
